Robert Lamartine (15 June 1935 – 16 January 1990) was a French football midfielder. He played in one European Cup final in 1959.

References

 

1935 births
1990 deaths
French footballers
Association football midfielders
Ligue 1 players
Stade de Reims players
Angers SCO players
Montpellier HSC players
Stade Rennais F.C. players